Donald Reid Williams (September 2, 1935 – December 20, 1991), nicknamed "Dino", was an American professional baseball player.

Born in Los Angeles, Williams began his 11-year professional career in 1955. Eight years later, after a successful half-season with the Triple-A Dallas-Fort Worth Rangers, he was summoned by the Twins. He made his MLB debut on August 4, 1963, against the Kansas City Athletics, in whose farm system Williams had previously toiled.  In that game, he pitched 1⅓ innings of scoreless relief, although he did allow an inherited runner to score and loaded the bases in his final inning. His other two outings, on August 13 against the Baltimore Orioles and August 17 against the Washington Senators, were less successful. Williams returned to the minor leagues and remained there through the 1966 season.

In 4⅓ Major League innings pitched, Williams gave up eight hits (including a home run to Washington's Dick Phillips),  five earned runs, and six bases on balls.

References

External links

1935 births
1991 deaths
Albany Senators players
Atlanta Crackers players
Baseball players from Los Angeles
Charlotte Hornets (baseball) players
Charleston White Sox players
Columbia Gems players
Dallas Rangers players
Hawaii Islanders players
Little Rock Travelers players
Major League Baseball pitchers
Minnesota Twins players
Mobile Bears players
Pocatello Bannocks players
Shreveport Sports players
Vancouver Mounties players